The 2022 Denton mayoral election was held on May 7, 2022, to elect the mayor of Denton, Texas. The election was nonpartisan, so both candidates appeared as independent on the ballot. Denton mayors have two-year terms.

Incumbent mayor Gerard Hudspeth won re-election to his second term, defeating mayor pro tempore and at-large city council member Paul Meltzer in the May election by a close four point margin.

Candidates 

 Paul Meltzer, current Mayor Pro Tem & at-large city council member since 2018, businessman
 Gerard Hudspeth, mayor since 2020, former city council member, businessman

References 

Denton mayoral
Denton